The following is a list of symbols of the U.S. state of Wyoming.

Insignia

Wyoming State Code 
Wyoming enacted the "Code of the West" as the State Code of Wyoming on March 3, 2010. The code includes the following:

 Live each day with courage;
 Take pride in your work;
 Always finish what you start;
 Do what has to be done;
 Be tough, but fair;
 When you make a promise, keep it;
 Ride for the brand;
 Talk less, say more;
 Remember that some things are not for sale;
 Know where to draw the line.

Living symbols

Earth symbols

Cultural symbols

United States coin

References

Wyoming culture
Wyoming
Symbols